"You're a God" is a song by American rock band Vertical Horizon from their third studio album, Everything You Want. The single reached  23 on the US Billboard Hot 100. Two versions of the song exist: one featured on the album, the other featured in the music video and radio version, dubbed the "Pop Mix," mixed by Tom Lord-Alge.

Background

Singer Matt Scannell said, "'You're A God' was written about when we give people in our lives power over us. It can be anything, whether it's a romantic thing or not - this one wasn't." He added that the song was partially inspired by a person in his life who had power over him and was making him miserable, and he realized all he had to do was stop looking up to them and start looking down on them, and he could take their power away. "And that's why that song starts off, 'I gotta be honest, we're covered in lies and that's okay.' ... Really, the title is ironic: you're a god and I am not - well, that's actually not true anymore, because now you're not a god."

Music video
The music video (directed by The Malloys) was based around a beauty pageant contestant, played by actress Tiffani Thiessen.

Charts

Release history

References

1999 songs
2000 singles
Music videos directed by The Malloys
RCA Records singles
Songs written by Matt Scannell
Vertical Horizon songs